Stongfjorden is a village in Askvoll Municipality in Vestland county, Norway. The village is an industrial area that was home to the first aluminum manufacturing plant in Scandinavia, Stangfjorden Elektrokemiske Fabriker from 1908 to 1946. The Stongfjorden Chapel is located in the village.

References

Villages in Vestland
Askvoll